Korićna  is a village in the municipality of Glamoč in Canton 10, the Federation of Bosnia and Herzegovina, Bosnia and Herzegovina.

The climate is warm and temperate in Korićna. Korićna has a significant amount of rainfall during the year. This is true even for the driest month. According to Köppen and Geiger, this climate is classified as Cfb. The temperature here averages 6.9 °C. The average annual rainfall is 1127 mm.

Demographics 

According to the 2013 census, the village was uninhabited.

Footnotes

Bibliography 

 

Populated places in Glamoč